The UWA World Lightweight Championship (Campeonato Mundial de Peso Ligero UWA in Spanish) is an inactive professional wrestling championship promoted by the Mexican wrestling promotion Universal Wrestling Association (UWA) from 1975 until some time around 2000 when Kato Kung Lee, Jr. stopped defending it. The first champion was El Matematico, winning the title in December 1975. When the UWA closed in 1995 the title was vacated, but 2 years later it was brought back as an Independent circuit title when Kato Kung Lee, Jr. won it.

As it was a professional wrestling championship, the championship was not won not by actual competition, but by a scripted ending to a match determined by the bookers and match makers. On occasion the promotion declares a championship vacant, which means there is no champion at that point in time. This can either be due to a storyline, or real life issues such as a champion suffering an injury being unable to defend the championship, or leaving the company.

Title history

Footnotes

References

External links
UWA World Lightweight Title

Lightweight wrestling championships
Universal Wrestling Association championships
World professional wrestling championships